This is a list of singles which have reached number one on the Irish Singles Chart in 1973.

See also 
 1973 in music
 Irish Singles Chart
 List of artists who reached number one in Ireland

1973 in Irish music
1973 record charts
1973